Schoenfelderpeton is an extinct genus of prehistoric amphibian. It is a sister taxon to Leptorophus tener.

See also
 Prehistoric amphibian
 List of prehistoric amphibians

References

Branchiosaurids
Prehistoric amphibian genera